The Festival Presidente (Presidente Festival) previously known as Festival Presidente de Música Latina, is a music festival in the Dominican Republic. It is one of the most important musical events in Latin America and is the largest in the Caribbean region. The festival is arranged by the Cervecería Nacional Dominicana (makers of Presidente beer) and is celebrated every two years for three days during October in the Estadio Olímpico Félix Sánchez of Santo Domingo.

History 
The idea of the Festival came about in 1995, when the Cervecería Nacional Dominicana chose to make an event to reward the loyalty of the Dominican people towards Cerveza Presidente.

In 2007, the Dominican National Brewery cancelled the festival due to the new tax for beer sells imputed by the Dominican Government.-
In 2010 The Festival came back in August, as well as in 2014. 2017 was the biggest version of the festival, held the first weekend of November at Estadio Olímpico Félix Sánchez.

Festival Lineups

1997

National Artists 
 Los Toros Band
 Los Hermanos Rosario
 Eddy Herrera
 Fernando Villalona 
 Tabú Tek

International Artists 
 Gilberto Santa Rosa
 Thalía
 Emanuel
 Marc Anthony
 Tito Rojas y orquesta
 Ana Bárbara
 Carlos Vives
 Enrique Iglesias
 Alejandro Fernández

1998

National Artists
 Los Hermanos Rosario
 Fernando Villalona
 Milly Quezada

International Artists
Alejandro Fernández
Maná
Ricky Martin
Carlos Vives
Juan Gabriel
Víctor Manuelle
Jerry Rivera
Azúcar Moreno
Grupo Niche
DLG

1999

National Artists
Tribu del Sol
Toño Rosario
Fernando Villalona
Raulín Rodríguez
Ilegales
Los Toros Band

International Artists
 Shakira
Carlos Ponce
Víctor Manuelle
Tito Rojas
Elvis Crespo
Nek
Chayanne 
Marc Anthony
Enrique Iglesias

2001

National Artists
Eddy Herrera
Rafa Rosario
Los Toros Band
Hermanos Rosario
Ciudad de Angeles
Zacarías Ferreira
Julio Sabala

International Artists
Alejandro Fernández
MDO
Marc Anthony
Ricardo Arjona
Gilberto Santa Rosa
Alejandro Sanz 
Maná
Azul Azul

2003

National Artists
Ilegales
Milly Quezada
Monchy y Alexandra
Aventura
Sergio Vargas

International Artists
Rosario
Bacilos
Juanes
Ricardo Montaner
La Ley
Ricardo Arjona
Gilberto Santa Rosa
El Gran Combo de Puerto Rico
Chayanne

2005

National Artists
Negros
Frank Reyes
Eddy Herrera
Sergio Vargas
Krispy
Rubby Perez
Rafa Rosario
Hector Acosta "El torito"

International Artists
Diego Torres
Marc Anthony
Julieta Venegas
David Bisbal 
Chayanne
Daddy Yankee 
Franco De Vita
Jennifer López

2010

National Artists
Omega
Pavel Núñez
Anthony Wood
Martha Heredia
Milly Quezada
Wason Brazobán
Juan Luis Guerra
Fernando Villalona
Sergio Vargas
Eddy Herrera
Toque Profundo
Marte o Venus
Bocatabú
Aljadaqui
Luis Vargas
Luis Miguel del Amargue
Luis Segura
Tito Swing
El Cata
Los Pepe (Doble T y El Crok)
Maridalia Hernández
Joseito Mateo

International Artists
Juanes
Don Omar
Luis Enrique
Tito El Bambino 
Camila
Wisin & Yandel 
Gilberto Santa Rosa
Luis Fonsi
T-Pain
50 Cent
Jowell y Randy
Cosculluela 
De La Ghetto
Franco El Gorila
Tico El Inmigrante
Jadiel
Pitbull

2014

National Artists
Don Miguelo
Vakeró
Mozart La Para
Alex Matos (cantante)
Chiquito Team Band
Miriam Cruz
Hector Acosta
Anthon Santos
Sexappeal
Yiyo Sarante

International Artists
Bruno Mars
Calle 13
Tiësto
Duck Sauce
Prince Royce
Daddy Yankee
Maná
Wisin y Yandel
Gilberto Santa Rosa
Victor Manuel

2017

Friday, Nov 3 

Enrique Iglesias
Marc Anthony
Maluma
Ozuna
Bad Bunny
Bryant Myers
Gabriel
Lapiz Conciente
El Alfa

Saturday, Nov 4 

Justin Timberlake
Zion y Lennox
Chiquito Team Band
Revolucion Salsera
Wisin
Carlos Vives
Nicky Jam

Sunday, Nov 5 

J Balvin
Farruko
Mozart La Para
Ricky Martin
El Mayor Clasico
Juan Luis Guerra
Milly Quezada
Jowell y Randy
Johnny Ventura

References

External links
 Festival Official site
 Festival Photos

Latin American music
Folk festivals in the Dominican Republic
Autumn events in the Dominican Republic
Events in Santo Domingo